

Events
 300 AD - Early Iron Age communities are established in the northern and eastern regions of Southern Africa
 500 AD - A group of Bantu-speaking tribes migrating southwards reached present-day KwaZulu-Natal Province
 696 AD - Arab  traders trade along the east coast of the Southern African region
 1050 - 1270 AD - Kingdom of Mapungubwe

References
See Years in South Africa

History of South Africa